The Alliance for Equality and European Justice (ABDE;) is a political party of Albania representing the Aromanian minority of the country. Afterwards, the members of the party began a signature collection campaign to fit the requirements of Albanian law that ask for parties to have 3,000 signatures to be legally registered. The ABDE obtained 3,899 signatures in favor of this and submitted a legal registration request that was accepted on 17 February 2012.

Following registration, the party claimed to have been created due to "the objective need of Albanian society to renew the political class" according to "the realities of the 21st century" and to "Albania's European perspective". It also said it would be a centre-right and pro-European political party and that it would form a coalition with the political entity that would win the 2013 Albanian parliamentary election and complained about the situation of education for the Aromanians in Albania, as at the time, there was only one Aromanian school in the whole country. Currently, one of the goals on its political program is the unification of all the Aromanians in Albania.

The foundation of the party raised controversy on Greek media, as it claimed that this "results in them [the Aromanians] being slowly cut off from their connection with the Greek trunk". Other acts of Aromanian emancipation in Albania are also usually seen negatively by some Greek media outlets, which describe the Aromanians as "Latin-speaking Greeks".

In 2021, an electoral coalition known as Alliance National Hour – Emigration – People's Union and Conservatives (AOKBPEK) was registered in Albania. This alliance was formed by ABDE and 6 other minor political parties in Albania to participate on the 2021 Albanian parliamentary election.

See also
 Democratic Union of the Vlachs of Macedonia, one of the two only Aromanian political parties outside Albania
 Party of the Vlachs of Macedonia, the other of the two Aromanian political parties outside Albania

References

2011 establishments in Albania
Political parties established in 2011
Political parties of minorities in Albania
Pro-European political parties in Albania
Centre-right parties in Europe
Aromanian political parties
Aromanians in Albania